Signal Mountain is a town in Hamilton County, Tennessee, United States. The town is a suburb of Chattanooga and is located on Walden Ridge. "Signal Mountain" is used as a colloquial name for the part of Walden Ridge close to the town. The town population was 8,852 as of the 2020 census and estimated to be 8,567 in 2018.

Geography
Signal Mountain is located in southwestern Hamilton County at 35°8′N 85°21′W (35.1291, -85.3424), atop the south end of Walden Ridge. The town is bordered to the south by the city of Chattanooga, to the northeast by the town of Walden, and to the north by the unincorporated community of Fairmount.

U.S. Route 127 (Ridgeway Avenue) is the main road through the town, leading south off the mountain  to downtown Chattanooga and north over Walden Ridge  to Dunlap.

History
Signal Mountain's history dates back years before settlement of the mountain itself. Centuries prior to the Civil War, Native Americans used a location on the mountain known as Signal Point to send fire and smoke signals across the Tennessee Valley. Later, the Union Army used Signal Point as a communications station during the Civil War. At the outbreak of the war, only a few families lived on the mountain. However, when various health epidemics struck Chattanooga in 1873 and 1878, several wealthy families relocated to the mountain where they could find clear air and pure water. In the early 20th century, Charles E. James purchased  of land in the Signal Point area and developed the mountain. While the streetcars are no longer used, the tracks remain in the streets of Signal Mountain's historic district named after Velma. On April 4, 1919, the Tennessee Legislature passed the bill that chartered the Town of Signal Mountain. During the 1970s, the town experienced significant growth. In 2013 Signal Mountain made Bloomberg Businessweeks' list of the best places to raise a family.

Notable people
 Susan Akin, 1986 Miss America
 Zane Birdwell, Grammy Award-winning recording engineer
 Rachel Boston, actress and producer
 Charles H. Coolidge, Medal of Honor recipient, namesake of Coolidge Park and member of 3rd Battalion, 141st Infantry Regiment
 Byron De La Beckwith, convicted murderer of civil rights leader Medgar Evers, moved to Walden, just outside of Signal Mountain, near the end of his life
 Emma Bell Miles, writer, poet, and artist
 Paul V. Nolan (1923–2009), Tennessee state legislator 1969-1970
 Suzanne Fisher Staples, author of award-winning Shiva's Fire and other books
 Mary Q. Steele and William O. Steele, a married pair of children's authors who separately wrote Newbery Honor-winning books
 KB Ballentine, poet of multiple collections of her work, local leader of writers groups

Demographics

2020 census

As of the 2020 United States census, there were 8,852 people, 3,096 households, and 2,419 families residing in the town.

2010 census
As of the census of 2010, there were 7,554 people, 2,950 households, and 2,175 families residing in the town. The racial makeup of the town was 98.2% White, 0.03% African American, 0.1% Native American, 0.5% Asian, and 0.2% from other races.

There were 2,960 households, of which 33.4% had children under the age of 18 living with them, 65.3% were married couples living together, 6.2% had a female householder with no husband present, and 26.5% were non-families. 25.1% of all households were made up of individuals, and 17.2% had someone living alone who was 65 years of age or older. The average household size was 2.51 and the average family size was 3.01.

The population of Signal Mountain was spread out, with 25.6% under the age of 18, 4.4% from 18 to 24, 22.2% from 25 to 44, 27.1% from 45 to 64 and 20.6% who were 65 years of age or older. The median age was 45.3 years. For every 100 females, there were 87.6 males. For every 100 females age 18 and over, there were 83.3 males.

The median income for a household was $78,900, and the median income for a family was $130,997. Males had a median income of $102,241 versus $54,878 for females. The per capita income for the town was $71,134. About 2.3% of families and 3.4% of the population were below the poverty line, including 3.3% of those under age 18 and 3.0% of those age 65 or over.

Attractions
Signal Mountain is home to a number of outdoors attractions, including the Cumberland Trail, Mabbitt Springs, and Signal Point, which is part of Chickamauga and Chattanooga National Military Park. Visitors and citizens have many different locations where they can hike and backpack, such as Rainbow Lake and Edward's Point.

The Signal Mountain Playhouse presents two plays per year including an outdoor musical every summer in the natural amphitheatre behind the Town Hall. The MACC (Mountain Arts Community Center), located in the historic Signal Mountain Elementary School building, offers classes in music, dance, and visual arts. The neighboring town of Walden hosts an outdoor public playground and pavilion called the Pumpkin Patch that is open for all to enjoy. Also, Bachman Community Center has many annual events as well as a small library and community garden plots. The New Mountain Opry hosts a weekly bluegrass music show every Friday evening.

Schools
 Elementary schools: 
Nolan Elementary (named after Dr. Paul V. Nolan)
Thrasher Elementary (named after Wilkes T. Thrasher)
Signal Mountain Christian School
 Middle School: Signal Mountain Middle/High School
 High School: Signal Mountain Middle/High School

References

External links

 Town of Signal Mountain official website
 Signal Mountain Library
 Mountain Arts Community Center
 Signal Mountain Playhouse
 Signal Mountain Hiking Trails
 Signal Mountain Middle/High School

Towns in Hamilton County, Tennessee
Towns in Tennessee
Chattanooga metropolitan area